Akansha Sareen is an Indian model and actress who is best known for her negative lead roles in Dil Toh Happy Hai Ji, Shaadi Mubarak and Zindagi Mere Ghar Aana.

Early life and education
Akansha Sareen was born on 8 August 1992 in Punjab to Sanjeev and Anju Sareen and raised in Delhi. She did her schooling in Cambridge School, Delhi and Ryan International School, Surat. She subsequently studied Journalism and Mass Communication at Amity University.

Career
After receiving her bachelor's degree in Journalism and Mass Communication from Amity University, Sareen worked as a Content Executive for Tangerine Digital. Akansha made her TV debut in MTV's reality show Nano Drive with MTV. She has appeared in several episodes of popular shows such as Aahat, Hum Ne Li Hai...Shapath, CID, Savdhaan India and Crime Patrol. She received wider recognition following her parallel lead role as Dr Riya Kapoor in Savitri Devi College & Hospital on Colors TV. Following this, she appeared in a cameo role in Yeh Teri Galliyan and earned positive reviews from critics. Later Sareen gained immense popularity with her negative lead roles in Dil Toh Happy Hai Ji, Shaadi Mubarak and Zindagi Mere Ghar Aana.

Filmography

Television

2022.          Gangubai Kathiawadi

Web-Series

See also 
 List of Hindi television actresses
 List of Indian television actresses

References

External links 
 

Living people
People from Delhi
Actors from Punjab, India
Indian television actresses
Actresses in Hindi television
Indian soap opera actresses
21st-century Indian actresses
1992 births